Codex Koridethi, also named Codex Coridethianus, designated by siglum Θ or 038 (in the Gregory-Aland numbering of New Testament manuscripts), ε050 (Soden numbering of New Testament manuscripts), is a Greek uncial manuscript of the New Testament, written on parchment. Using the study of comparative writing styles (palaeography), it has been assigned to the 9th century CE. The manuscript has several gaps.

Description 

The manuscript is a codex (precursor to the modern book), containing an almost complete text of the four Gospels written on 249 parchment leaves (size 29 cm by 24 cm), with the following gaps: Matthew 1:1–9, 1:21–4:4, and 4:17–5:4. The text is written in two columns per page, with 19-32 lines per column. 

The letters are written in a rough, inelegant hand in blackish-brown ink. Greek accents (used to indicate voiced pitch changes) are written, but breathing marks (utilised to designate vowel emphasis) are rarely included. The scribe who wrote the text is believed to have been unfamiliar with Greek. The manuscript includes the Ammonian sections, but not always the Eusebian Canons (both early systems of dividing the four Gospels into different sections); lectionary (weekly church reading portions) beginning (αρψη / arche) and ending (τελος / telos) marks are also written. 

Quotations from the Old Testament are marked. The tables of contents (known as κεφαλαια / kephalaia) are included before the gospels of Mark, Luke, and John, and a brief subscription is written after the Gospel of John ends.

Text of the codex 

The Greek text of the Gospel of Matthew chapters 1-14, and the whole of the Gospel of Luke and Gospel of John is considered to be more or less a representative of the Byzantine text-type, while the text of the Gospel of Mark has been considered to be a representative of the Caesarean text-type. The text-types are groups of different New Testament manuscripts which share specific or generally related readings, which then differ from each other group, and thus the conflicting readings can separate out the groups. These are then used to determine the original text as published; there are three main groups with names: Alexandrian, Western, and Byzantine. The Caesarean text-type however (initially identified by biblical scholar Burnett Hillman Streeter) has been contested by several text-critics, such as Kurt and Barbara Aland. The text of Matthew chapters 14-28 has been considered to be a representative of the Alexandrian text-type. Aland placed it in Category II of his New Testament manuscript classification system. Category II manuscripts are described as being manuscripts "of a special quality, i.e., manuscripts with a considerable proportion of the early text, but which are marked by alien influences. These influences are usually of smoother, improved readings, and in later periods by infiltration by the Byzantine text." It lacks the text of the Pericope Adulterae (John 7:53-8:11).

 Caesarean text-type?
(See main article the Caesarean text-type)

Streeter based his identification of a new text-type primarily on the readings found on this codex in the Gospel of Mark, and their corresponding appearances in the biblical citations in the writings of the early church father, Origen. He also grouped the manuscripts of ƒ, ƒ, and the minuscules 28, 565 and 700 along with Codex Koridethi, initially designating them as fam. Θ.  His reasonings were developed further by biblical scholars Kirsopp Lake, Robert Blake and Silva New, resulting in this fam. Θ being designated the Caesarean Text-type in their joint publication, The Caesarean text of the Gospel of Mark, with Codex Koridethi being considered the Caesarean Text's chief representative. Though further publications sought to establish the Caesarean Text as a definitive text-type, by the end of the 20th century this notion had failed to convince the majority of scholars.

 Witness to the Byzantine text-type?
In 2007 the German Bible Society edited The Gospel According to John in the Byzantine Tradition. Codex Koridethi is cited in the apparatus, and it says: "Manuscript 038 (Θ) represents a text on the boundary of what might reasonably be considered a manuscript of the Byzantine tradition in John".

 Some readings

 (Josiah fathered Jehoiakim; Jehoiakim fathered Jeconiah) - Θ M ƒ 33 258 478 661 791 ℓ 54 al
 (Josiah fathered Jeconiah) - Majority of manuscripts

 (and when the centurion returned to the house in that hour, he found the slave well) - Θ  C (N) 0250 ƒ g, sy
omit - Majority of manuscripts

 (saying, 'Peace to this house.) - Θ * D L W ƒ 1010 (1424) it vg
 (this) - Majority of manuscripts

 (But those tenants, looking on as he arrived) - Θ ƒ 28 1071

 (and be baptized with the baptism that I am baptized with)
omit - Θ  B D L Z 085 ƒ ƒ it sy sa
incl. - Majority of manuscripts

 (Jesus Barabbas) - Θ 700 ƒ
 (Jesus) - Majority of manuscripts

 (my clothes for themselves, and they cast lots for my cloak) — Θ Δ 0250 ƒ ƒ 537 1424

 (for everything shall be consumed by fire) - Θ (singular reading)
 (for everything shall be seasoned with fire)- Majority of manuscripts

 (donkey, son, or ox) - Θ (singular reading)
 (son or ox) - Majority of manuscripts

ὁ δὲ Ἰησοῦς ἔλεγεν Πάτερ ἄφες αὐτοῖς· οὐ γὰρ οἴδασιν τί ποιοῦσιν (And Jesus said: Father forgive them, they know not what they do.)
omit - Θ   B D* W 0124 1241 a d sy sa bo
incl. - Majority of manuscripts

 (the sea of Galilee in the region of Tiberius) – Θ D 892 1009 1230 1253

 (from Kariot) - Θ  ƒ syr
 (Iscariot) - Majority of manuscripts

 (for everyone who takes the sword shall be destroyed by the sword) – Θ (singular reading)

 History 

It is commonly believed the text gets its name from the town in which it was discovered, however this is not correct. The first publication of the entire manuscript by Beermann and Gregory states:Kala/Caucasia:In the year 1853 a certain Bartholomeé visited a long abandoned monastery in Kala, a little village in the Caucasian mountains near the Georgian/Russian border (some miles south east of the 5600m high Elbrus). There, in an old church, far off every civilisation, he discovered the MS. The MS rested there probably for several hundred years (Beermann: ca. 1300–1869).Koridethi:Before this time the MS was in a town called Koridethi. This was a village near the Black Sea, near today's Batumi in Georgia. There should still be some ruins of a monastery. Notes in the Gospel indicate dates from ca. 965 CE on. At around this time, according to a note, the book has been rebound. The book was there until around 1300 CE.Further south, Armenia:A Greek inscription mentions the city of Tephrice or Tephrike''': "I, Kurines, Comes of the comandant of the city Tephrice came to the castelles and went back to the fort of the Great Martyrs(?)." Even though the content and meaning is not completely clear, the city Tephrice is clear. The town was destroyed in 873. It was on a line between today's Sivas and Malatya in Turkey/Armenia. Beermann's conclusion therefore is (p. 581) that the codex must be older than 873 CE. Beermann speculates that the "fort of the Great Martyrs" (if correctly deciphered) might have been Martyropolis, a town near the Wan Lake, near today's Batman in Turkey.

The codex is now located in Tbilisi, at the Georgian National Center of Manuscripts, Gr. 28.

 See also 
 List of New Testament uncials

 Notes 

 Further reading 
  
 Herman C. Hoskier, Collation of Koridethi with Scrivener's Reprint of Stephen III, Bulletin of the Bezan Club 6 (1929), pp. 31–56. 
 F. G. Kenyon, Our Bible and the Ancient Manuscripts (4th ed.), London 1939.
 

 External links 
 R. Waltz, Codex Koridethi at the Encyclopedia of Textual Criticism'' (2007)
 Digital Images of Codex Koridethi online at the CSNTM.
 Sakartvélo, Tbilisi, National Center of Manuscripts (olim AN Inst. Kekelidze), gr. 28 Pinakes | Πίνακες, Textes et manuscrits grecs

Greek New Testament uncials
9th-century biblical manuscripts